Glasgow Southside is a constituency of the Scottish Parliament (Holyrood), being one of eight constituencies within the Glasgow City council area. It elects one Member of the Scottish Parliament (MSP) by the plurality (first past the post) method of election. It is also one of nine constituencies in the Glasgow electoral region, which elects seven additional members, in addition to the nine constituency MSPs, to produce a form of proportional representation for the region as a whole. It is currently the constituency of outgoing First Minister Nicola Sturgeon, who has held it for the Scottish National Party since the seat was created for 2011 Scottish Parliament election.

Electoral region 

The other eight constituencies of the Glasgow region are Glasgow Anniesland, Glasgow Cathcart, Glasgow Kelvin, Glasgow Maryhill and Springburn, Glasgow Pollok, Glasgow Provan, Glasgow Shettleston and Rutherglen.

The region covers the Glasgow City council area and a north-western portion of the South Lanarkshire council area.

Constituency boundaries and council areas 

The electoral wards used in the creation of Southside were:

In full: Southside Central, Pollokshields
In part: Govan (shared with Pollok)

Member of the Scottish Parliament 
The First Minister, Nicola Sturgeon, has represented the constituency since its creation in 2011 election. She was previously an MSP for the Glasgow regional list from 1999 to 2007, and Glasgow Govan between 2007 and 2011 until the abolition of that constituency.

Constituency profile 
The constituency has attracted a high amount media interest over the years due to its status as the constituency of the First Minister. A profile in The Scotsman described it as, "one of Scotland’s most diverse constituencies. It takes in the gated mansions of Pollokshields as well as Ibrox and Govan, which once teemed with shipyard workers. It takes in Strathbungo, with its Greek Thomson terraces as well as the Gorbals, a former melting pot of Irish, Italian and Jewish immigration."

Problems with slum landlords, vermin and refuse collections have been highlighted as particular issues in the area. During the 2021 Scottish Parliament election, Glasgow City Council were accused of dispatching cleaners to the constituency to spruce it up prior to press events in the area.

Elections

2020s

2010s

See also
 Politics of Glasgow

Notes

External links

Govan
Politics of Glasgow
Scottish Parliament constituencies and regions from 2011
Nicola Sturgeon
Constituencies of the Scottish Parliament
2011 establishments in Scotland
Constituencies established in 2011
Gorbals
Pollokshields
Govanhill and Crosshill